"Kiseki" (奇跡 / Miracle) is Japanese soloist Kumi Koda's thirteenth domestic single. It reached No. 7 on Oricon and stayed on the charts for ten weeks.

Information
Kiseki is Japanese singer-songwriter Kumi Koda's thirteenth single. It peaked in the top ten on Oricon, coming in at No. 7, and remained on the charts for ten weeks.

The single became Kumi's second single to be released in both CD and CD+DVD formats, her first being Love & Honey. The CD only version was of limited release, while the CD+DVD edition can still be found by various vendors.

Kumi helped write the lyrics to both Kiseki and life. Love Holic became the first song the artist wrote the full lyrics to, not collaborating with another lyricist.

The title track was a power ballad, with the accompanying b-sides being upbeat pop songs.

Promotional advertisements
Kiseki was the theme of NHK's television program J-League (Jリーグ / J-RIIGU).

Love Holic (stylized as LOVE HOLIC) was the ending theme of TBS' television program World Crunchy☆Value (世界バリバリ☆バリュー / Sekai Bari Bari☆BARYUU).

Track list
(Source)

Charts
Oricon Sales Chart (Japan)

  Total Sales :  60,033 (Japan)

Alternate versions
Kiseki
Kiseki: Found on the single (2004) and corresponding album secret (2005)
Kiseki [Instrumental]: Found on the single (2004)
Kiseki [GTS SH Club Remix]: Found on Koda Kumi Driving Hit's 4 (2012)

References

Avex Network (2005), Kumi Koda Official Web Site
Oricon Style (2005), Ranking – Oricon Style

2004 singles
2004 songs
Koda Kumi songs
Rhythm Zone singles
Songs written by Koda Kumi